Simani in Iran may refer to:
 Simani-ye Olya
 Simani-ye Sofla